Fatehpur is a town in Barabanki district in the state of Uttar Pradesh in India. It is also a Nagar panchayat, Police station and Tehsil. It is the second biggest urban area of the district after Barabanki city. It is about 35 km north-east of Lucknow, the state capital. Yugantar Inter College is situated here.

Geography
It has an average elevation of 140 metres (460 feet).

Demographics
 India census, Fatehpur (NP) had a population of 35,582, of which males were 18,649 and females 16,933. Population within the age group of 0 to 6 years was 4,963. The total number of literates in Fatehpur was 20,956, which constituted 58.9% of the population with male literacy of 61.6% and female literacy of 55.9%. The effective literacy rate of 7+ population of Barabanki was 68.4%, of which male literacy rate was 71.6% and female literacy rate was 65.1%. The Scheduled Caste population was 1,767 and the total number of households was 5617.

Languages
Hindi is the official language of Fatehpur while Urdu serves as the additional official language.

Administration
Fatehpur tehsil has three Block Panchayats, they are:
 Fatehpur
 Nindura
 Suratganj

Block Panchayat Fatehpur
Block Panchayat Fatehpur has 86 Village Panchayats, they are

Transportation

By road
Fatehpur has connectivity to Lucknow, Barabanki, Mahmoodabad, Burhwal, Dewa, Suratganj, Hetmapur, Rampur Mathura, Lalpur Karauta. It has regular bus service from Lucknow and Barabanki.

By rail
Fatehpur railway station is two kilometres away from the town area, block development office (BDO), and Munshiganj. It is located on Burhwal-Sitapur chord section Of North Eastern Railway (NER) zone which connects directly to Delhi, Punjab and Jammu via Shahjahanpur, Rampur, Moradabad and has one platform with three running lines including one main line with interlocking signaling system.

Education
 Awadh College Of Pharmacy
 Govt. Polytechnic, Kursi Road

Health services
Tehsil Fatehpur has five Health centres, three Primary health centres and seven Sub-centres.

Energy park programme
Fatehpur was identified in 2006 as an area for development under the Non-Conventional Energy program of the Non-Conventional Energy Development Agency (Neda).

References

External links
 
 Uttar Pradesh statistics
 PIN Code

Cities and towns in Barabanki district